Parrs Wood is an area of East Didsbury, in south Manchester, England.

It was formerly the estate surrounding Parrs Wood House, an 18th-century Georgian villa.

Today the area incorporates part of Wilmslow Road and is home to Parrs Wood High School and Sixth Form Centre, a Tesco supermarket, and Parrs Wood Entertainment Centre.

Parrs Wood Entertainment Centre 

Following a deal to build a new school in exchange for land, Parrs Wood Entertainment Centre was completed in 2001. The centre is owned by Land Securities, the largest commercial property company in the UK. Attractions and businesses in the Entertainment Centre include bowling (also includes Lazer, and American pool and arcade area), cinema, restaurants, health club (including a swimming pool), casino and hotel.

Stores

Main Units

 Cineworld
 Tenpin Ltd 
 Nuffield Health
 Grosvenor Casinos

Restaurants and Cafés

 Pizza Hut
 Nandos
 Wagamama
 Starbucks
 Five Guys

Transport

Parrs Wood is the southern terminus of the Wilmslow Road bus corridor, a busy bus route into central Manchester.

It is also the terminus of the South Manchester Line of the Manchester Metrolink network, at East Didsbury tram stop which is located on the eastern side of Kingsway.

References

External links
Parrs Wood High School
Battlefield Live Manchester - An outdoor combat game based at Parrs Wood High School
Redmox Leisure - A children's entertainment company based at Parrs Wood High School
Parrs Wood Celtic Football Club
Parrs Wood Entertainment Centre website
Xscape website
X-Leisure company website
Parrs Wood Rural Studies Centre

Areas of Manchester